Proscaline (4-propoxy-3,5-DMPEA) is a psychedelic and hallucinogenic drug.  It has structural properties similar to the drugs mescaline, isoproscaline, and escaline.  In PiHKAL, Alexander Shulgin reports that a dose of 30–60 mg produces effects lasting 8–12 hours.

Chemistry
Proscaline is in a class of compounds commonly known as phenethylamines, and is the 4-propoxy homolog of mescaline.  The full name of the chemical is 4-propoxy-3,5-dimethoxyphenethylamine.

Legality

Proscaline is a Class A controlled substance in the UK.

Proscaline is unscheduled and unregulated in the United States, but it could be considered an analog of a schedule I drug, mescaline, under the Federal Analog Act and thus be subject to the same control measures and penalties for possession and manufacture as a Schedule I drug.

See also
 Substituted phenethylamine
 Allylescaline
 3C-P
 Mescaline
 PiHKAL

References

Psychedelic phenethylamines
Designer drugs
Phenol ethers
Mescalines